The Juyushi Mosque was built by the vizier Badr al-Jamali who was Amir al-Juyush for the Fatimid Caliphate. The mosque was completed in 478 AH/1085 CE under the patronage of Imam-Caliph al-Mustansir Billah. It was built on an end of the Mokattam to ensure a view of Cairo.

In the Ottoman period, the mosque was probably used by Sufis as a monastery.

Features
The foundation of the mosque has an inscription which identifies the structure as a mazar.

The mosque has one dome and a minaret. There is a small courtyard in the center of the mosque. The entrance is a door to the minaret situated besides the prayer hall. There are 2 rooms, one on each side of the minaret. The minaret is a rectangular shaft with a second receding story. On this, there is a dome similar to the one above the mihrab. The Minaret is embellished with muqarnas cornice.

Over the entrance there is an inscription which begins with Quranic verses 72:18 & 9:108
And the places of worship are for God, so invoke not any one along with God.

Never stand thou forth therein. There is a mosque whose foundation was laid from the first day on piety; it is more worthy of the standing forth therein. In it are men who love to be purified; and God loves those who make themselves pure.
The inscription further continues: The construction of ...Mashad...ordered by...Imam al-Mustansir....may the blessing of God be upon him ...his Forefathers, the pure Imams.....make his word prevail and deceive his enemies....as he seeks the good pleasure of God..Moharram 478.

The mihrab is elaborate with stucco carving with spandrels upon the arch. On the exterior of mihrab is inscription of verses 24:11, 24:36, 24:37 and 10:23.

Those who brought forward the lie are a body among yourselves, think it not to be an evil to you, On the contrary, it is good for you. To every man among them of the sin that he earned. And to him who took on himself the lead among them, will be a penalty grievous.

In houses, which God has permitted to be raised to honor; for the celebration, in them, of His name. In them is He glorified in the mornings and in the evenings. By men whom neither traffic nor merchandise can divert from the Remembrance of God, establishing Prayer or giving Charity: Their fear is for the Day when hearts and eyes will be transformed.

But when he delivers them they transgress insolently through the earth in defiance of the truth. O mankind! your insolence is against your own souls, an enjoyment of the life of the present: in the end, to Us is your return, and We shall show you the truth of all that you did.

Around the dome's octagon is inscribed verses 48:1-5:Verily We have granted you a manifest Victory. That God may forgive you your faults of the past and those to follow; fulfil His favour to thee; and guide thee on the Straight Way. And that God may help thee with powerful help. It is He Who sent down tranquillity into the hearts of the faithful, that they may add faith to their faith; for to God belong the Forces of the heavens and the earth; and God is Full of Knowledge and Wisdom. That He may admit the faithful men and faithful women, to Gardens beneath which rivers flow, to dwell therein, and remove their ills from them; and that is, in the sight of God, the highest achievement.

At the summit of the dome is a six-pointed star formed by words Muhammad and Ali each repeated thrice, in form of a medallion. Around the star inscribed verse 35:39:He it is that has made you inheritors in the earth. If, then, any do reject, their rejection is against themselves, their rejection but adds to the odium for the deniers in the sight of their Lord. Their rejection but adds to undoing.

Restoration

By the 20th century, the mosque was a ruin. After having researched the structure, the mosque was rebuilt by the Dawoodi Bohra community under the leadership of Mohammad Burhanuddin. Architectural elements from other Fatimid structures in Egypt were used as clues as to what to put where during the restoration.

See also
  Lists of mosques 
  List of mosques in Africa
  List of mosques in Egypt
Al-Hakim Mosque
Aqmar Mosque
Lulua Mosque

References

Further reading
 al-Juyushi: A Vision of the Fatemiyeen by Ja'far us Sadiq M. Saifuddin

11th-century mosques
Mosque buildings with domes
Mosques in Cairo
Medieval Cairo
11th-century establishments in the Fatimid Caliphate
Fatimid architecture in Cairo